Sport Lisboa e Benfica, commonly known as Benfica, is a Portuguese professional football team based in Lisbon. The club was formed in 1904 as Sport Lisboa and played its first competitive match on 4 November 1906, when it entered the inaugural edition of the Campeonato de Lisboa.

This page includes Benfica seasons in Portuguese football and UEFA competitions (plus the Latin Cup and the Inter-Cities Fairs Cup) from the first to the last completed season. Moreover, it details the team's achievements in major competitions, as well as the top goalscorers for each season.

Key 

Table headers
Pos – Final position in the league classification
Pld – Number of league matches played
W – Number of league matches won
D – Number of league matches drawn
L – Number of league matches lost
GF – Number of goals scored in league matches
GA – Number of goals conceded in league matches
Pts – Number of points at the end of the league

Divisions
Regional – Lisbon regional championship

Results and rounds
  1st  or  W  – Champions or Winners
  2nd  or  RU  – Runners-up
 SF – Semi-finals
 QF – Quarter-finals
 R16, R32, R64 – Round of 16, 32, and 64
 1R, 2R, 3R, 4R – First, second, third, and fourth round
 GS – (First) Group stage
 3Q – Third qualifying round
 PR – Preliminary round

Top scorers
Players whose name is in italics were also the regional championship or Primeira Liga top scorers.
GS – Players who were also top scorers in Europe (European Golden Shoe).

Seasons

Notes

References 

Seasons
 
Benfica
S